Karim Darwish may be:
Karim Darwish (politician), member of the Egyptian parliament
Karim Darwish (squash), Egyptian squash player

See also
Karim Darwich, Lebanese footballer